Hans Otto Erdmann (18 December 1896 – 4 September 1944) was a German Army officer, and member of the German Resistance.

Biography 
Erdmann was born in Insterburg, East Prussia (modern Chernyakhovsk, Russia). In the First World War Erdmann served as an officer in the German Army and later worked as a postal clerk. In 1935 he joined the Wehrmacht and was deployed at the Generalkommando in Königsberg in 1944 in the rank of Oberstleutnant (Lieutenant Colonel).

In June 1944 Claus von Stauffenberg informed Erdmann about the planned assassination of Hitler. In the Operation Valkyrie plans, Erdmann was supposed to organize the occupation of public buildings and broadcasting stations in East Prussia.

After the 20 July plot had failed, Erdmann was arrested on 17 August 1944 and sentenced to death by the Volksgerichtshof under Günther Nebelung on 4 September 1944, along with Kurt Hahn, Gerhard Knaak, Heinrich Graf von Lehndorff-Steinort and Max Ulrich von Drechsel. All were hanged on the same day at Plötzensee Prison in Berlin.

References 

1896 births
1944 deaths
Executed members of the 20 July plot
German Army personnel of World War I
German Army officers of World War II
Executed German people
People condemned by Nazi courts
People from East Prussia
People from Insterburg
People executed by hanging at Plötzensee Prison
German people executed by Nazi Germany